Marne (pronunciation [marni]) is a city in Cass County, Iowa, United States. The population was 110 at the time of the 2020 census.

History 
Marne got its beginnings when, in 1875, German investors from a settlement in Davenport, Iowa filed papers and plotted land purchased from Thomas Meredith. The city's name is taken from that of Marne, Germany.

Geography
Marne is located at  (41.448586, -95.111919).

Demographics

2010 census
As of the census of 2010, there were 120 people, 52 households, and 37 families residing in the city. The racial makeup of the city was 99.2% White and 0.8% from two or more races.

There were 52 households, of which 25.0% had children under the age of 18 living with them, 57.7% were married couples living together, 7.7% had a female householder with no husband present, 5.8% had a male householder with no wife present, and 28.8% were non-families. 25.0% of all households were made up of individuals, and 3.8% had someone living alone who was 65 years of age or older. The average household size was 2.31 and the average family size was 2.78.

The median age in the city was 44 years. 21.7% of residents were under the age of 18; 8.4% were between the ages of 18 and 24; 22.4% were from 25 to 44; 37.4% were from 45 to 64; and 10% were 65 years of age or older. The gender makeup of the city was 48.3% male and 51.7% female.

2000 census
As of the census of 2000, there were 149 people, 62 households, and 39 families residing in the city. The racial makeup of the city was 97.32% White, 0.67% Native American, and 2.01% from two or more races.

There were 62 households, out of which 32.3% had children under the age of 18 living with them, 53.2% were married couples living together, 8.1% had a female householder with no husband present, and 35.5% were non-families. 32.3% of all households were made up of individuals, and 11.3% had someone living alone who was 65 years of age or older. The average household size was 2.40 and the average family size was 3.03.

In the city, the population was spread out, with 25.5% under the age of 18, 8.7% from 18 to 24, 29.5% from 25 to 44, 22.1% from 45 to 64, and 14.1% who were 65 years of age or older. The median age was 37 years. For every 100 females, there were 84.0 males. For every 100 females age 18 and over, there were 98.2 males.

As of 2000 the median income for a household was $31,875, and the median income for a family was $36,806. Males had a median income of $26,406 versus $23,750 for females. The per capita income for the city was $13,998. There were 8.1% of families and 9.8% of the population living below the poverty line, including 8.3% of under eighteens and none of those over 64.

Education
Marne is within the Atlantic Community School District. Atlantic High School is the local school district.

References

External links

 City of Marne
 Seven Towns Where Land Is Free; CNBC.com; November 17, 2010

Cities in Cass County, Iowa
Cities in Iowa